The Bouncing Ball Killer, also known as the Bouncing Ball Slayer, the Bouncing Ball Strangler, and the Rubber Ball Strangler, was an unidentified American serial killer believed to have murdered at least six women in the Los Angeles area between May 1959 and June 1960. During the investigation, a multitude of suspects were considered, and although some were arrested and one reportedly confessed to the crimes, the case remains officially unsolved.

Murders 
The first murder attributed to the Bouncing Ball Killer occurred on May 28, 1959, when 57-year-old Ruth Gwinn was attacked while on her way home from work. The attacker brutally beat her, dragged her into a parking lot and raped her. As witnesses tried to intervene, the man fled. Gwinn survived long enough to tell police what had happened, though, it would only take a few hours until Gwinn died as a result of her injuries. Gwinn had previously been attacked seven years prior in 1952, near where she would later be killed in 1959, although minimal evidence suggested a link.

On January 29, 1960, 73-year-old Amanda E. Rockefellow was murdered. Her body was found in an alleyway two blocks away from her home. On February 10, 1960, 60-year-old Ann Cotter was murdered along Washing blvd while walking to church. Three months later, on May 1, 74-year-old Elmyra Miller was murdered via strangulation in her home. Evidence found at the home showed that it was likely a sexually motivated attack. Twelve days later, on May 13, 60-year-old Bessie Elva Green was raped and murdered in her apartment, which had also been burglarized. 

On June 20, 83-year-old Grace A. Moore was murdered in her home. Six days later, On June 26, 72-year-old Mercedes Langeron was raped and strangled to death with a bedsheet in her home. She was found by her roommate 62-year-old Adela Williams. Williams later told police that she had seen a man leaving the apartment as she entered it. The man, who she described as approximately six feet tall and black], was bouncing a rubber ball as he left. She also described him as wearing Ivy League clothes.

Investigation 
The murders were quickly grouped together, and based on Adela Williams' description, a composite sketch of the suspect was made and released by police artist Ector Garcia in June 1960. Newspapers and the media altogether nicknamed the killer the "Rubber Ball Strangler" and the more popular "Bouncing Ball Killer". Other news outlets nicknamed the killer as the "Bouncing Ball Slayer" and the "Bouncing Ball Strangler". While today the killer has officially never been caught, multiple suspects were questioned, arrested, and in some cases convicted, but many were ruled out.

Cleared suspects 
 Noble Harper - 38-year-old Noble Harper was arrested at local shopping market on July 3, 1960, after witnesses reported seeing him bouncing a rubber ball outside the building. He was also described as showing particular similarities with the sketch of the killer. Despite this, police found no evidence to suggest he was the killer, and the following day he was cleared as a suspect.

 Ray Williams - A bricklayer named Ray Williams was arrested on July 10, 1960, on suspicion of being the Bouncing Ball Killer after police noticed similarities in his looks to the sketch of the killer. His shoe size was also consistent with the killer. No other news articles on Williams exist after his arrest, so he was likely cleared of suspicion. 

 Joseph Malveaux - On July 23, 1960, 23-year-old Joseph Walter Malveaux was arrested after police spotted him loitering near the local coliseum. While being booked, police noticed similarities in Malveaux's facial features to that of the composite sketch of the Bouncing Ball Killer. During his interrogation, Malveaux told police that all of his friends also thought he looked like the killer but said that rumors of it being him was "a lot of boloney". His shoe size was consistent with the killer's, but besides that police struggled to find any other evidence linking him to the murders, and as such Malveaux was released from police custody.

Substantial suspects  
 Raymond W. Clemmons - On July 12, 1960, police responded to a call of a woman screaming near the city college campus. When they arrived, police noticed 35-year-old Raymond Ward Clemmons getting into his car, and stopped him for questioning. Nearby, police found the body of a woman, who was identified as 19-year-old Nina T. Thoeren. Clemmons was arrested and confessed to strangling Thoeren to death. He had a criminal record and at the time of Thoeren's murder, Clemmons was on parole after serving two years at San Quentin State Prison for a hit-and-run in 1956. According to his confession, Clemmons stated that he had offered Thoeren a ride, and presumably she jokingly asked him if he was the Bouncing Ball Killer, and in response, Clemmons said "Sure, I'm the Bouncing Ball killer. Look in the glove compartment. The ball is in there". Clemmons went further and confessed to being the Bouncing Ball Killer. In response to this, police ordered Clemmons to take a polygraph, which concluded that he was not being truthful when he said he was the Bouncing Ball Killer. Clemmons was sentenced to life imprisonment for the murder of Thoeron, and he was never convicted of any of the other murders. It is unknown what happened to Clemmons; he does not show up among those serving sentences in any California penitentiaries, but it is possible he could have been paroled. On July 21, 1982, the Santa Clarita Valley Signal reported the arrest of a man named Raymond Ward Clemmons for rape and kidnapping. He was 57 years old, which is how old Clemmons would have been in 1982.

 Burglar at 422 E. 6th St. - Mrs. Modie Hall, 48, and her granddaughter Mary Foster, 10, were attacked in their apartment by a man with a blunt object on August 18, 1960. A neighbor named Floyd Harris, 45, was awakened by the sounds of moaning and the distinct noise of a rubber ball making contact with the floor. He gave chase and the intruder fled. Both Foster and Hall were hospitalized for critical injuries to the head and face but ended up miraculously surviving. The attacker was believed to have been the then still-at-large Bouncing Ball Killer, and as such he was sought after, though police were unable to locate the suspect.

 Killer at 4907 S Hoover St. - On September 1, 1960, 84-year-old Lena Bensusen was badly beaten during a home invasion. She survived long enough for her to be taken to the hospital where she supposedly gave a description of her attacker, which reportedly matched the description given of the Bouncing Ball Killer. On September 6, Bensusen died from her injuries while being treated at Hollywood Presbyterian Medical Center.

 Henry Busch - The only person to be convicted of one of the Bouncing Ball Killer murders was Henry Adolph Busch. On September 6, 1960, police arrested the 28-year-old Busch for the attempted murder of a co-worker in Los Angeles. Police found a knife and a pair of handcuffs in his possession. As he was being booked at the police station, Busch confessed to the murders of two women that month; 72-year-old Shirley Payneas on September 4, and 53-year-old Margaret Briggs on September 5. He also confessed to the murder of Elmyra Miller, who was believed to have been murdered by the Bouncing Ball Killer. Busch stated his reasoning for the murders was that he had an irresistible urge to do so, though he would later say he had been inspired to kill after watching the movie Psycho, a claim that made headlines and even got the director of the film Alfred Hitchcock to respond and deny his movie would inspire violence. Busch would be tried, convicted, and sentenced to death for the three murders. He was executed via the gas chamber on June 6, 1962. He is not believed to have committed the other six murders.

 Charles Goldston - On August 28, 1961, Long Beach police arrested 20-year-old Charles James Golston (or Goldston) on charges of murder in the rape and strangling of 81-year-old Dora Ann Cutting. After his arrest, he was also questioned in the disappearance of 11-year-old Karen Lynn Tompkins, although he was later cleared of suspicion in that case. Los Angeles police were made aware of the arrest and sought to question Golston in the Bouncing Ball murders. In the end he was never definitely linked to the Los Angeles killings, and was subsequently tried, convicted, and sentenced to death for the murder of Cutting. He was first scheduled to be executed in January 1963, however Golston was granted a stay of execution by Justice William Douglas. In April 1963 Golston and three other death row inmates, Don Franklin, John Vlahovich, and Joseph Rosoto, were scheduled to be executed on May 3 of that year. He later successfully appealed and got a new stay of execution. In 1972, the Supreme Court of California ruled the death penalty was unconstitutional, and that same year following the supreme court decision Furman v. Georgia, the death penalty in the United States was ruled unconstitutional, causing everyone on death row, including Golston, to be re-sentenced to life imprisonment. From there, it is unclear what happened to him.

See also 
 List of serial killers in the United States

References 

1959 in California
1959 murders in the United States
1960 in California
1960 murders in the United States
20th-century American criminals
American rapists
American serial killers
Crimes in California
Deaths by strangulation in the United States
History of Los Angeles
History of women in California
Murder in California
Unidentified American serial killers
Unsolved murders in the United States